"Una Flor" ("A Flower") is a song by Colombian singer-songwriter Juanes for his sixth studio album Loco de Amor (2014). The song was released by Universal Music Latino as the third single from the record. It was written by Juanes and his guitarist Fernando Tobón, while production was by Steve Lillywhite and Juanes. "Una Flor" is the official soundtrack for the television serial drama Jane the Virgin.

Track listing 
Album version
 "Una Flor" –

Charts

Weekly charts

Year-end charts

References 

Songs about flowers
2014 songs
2014 singles
Juanes songs
Songs written by Juanes
Song recordings produced by Steve Lillywhite
Spanish-language songs
Universal Music Latino singles